Three Fugitives is a 1989 American buddy crime-comedy film written and directed by Francis Veber, starring Nick Nolte and Martin Short, with supporting roles by Sarah Doroff, James Earl Jones, Alan Ruck, and Kenneth McMillan in his final film appearance. It is a remake of Les Fugitifs, a 1986 French comedy starring Gérard Depardieu and Pierre Richard also directed by Veber.

The movie was popular at the box office, grossing more than $11.9 million its first two weeks of release, despite receiving a general negative reception from critics.

The film follows a former notorious bank robber who, on the day he gets out of prison, is randomly taken hostage by another inexperienced bank robber while trying to cash his prison check, leading the police to assume he is behind it.  A series of amusing situations ensue as the squabbling pair try to evade capture.

Plot 
Daniel Lucas has been in prison for armed robbery. On the day he is released, he gets taken hostage by Ned Perry, an incompetent, novice criminal who robs a bank (to get money for treatment for his ill daughter, Meg) at the moment Lucas just happens to be there.

Detective Marvin Dugan assumes they must be in it together and sets about tracking them down. Several chases, an accidental shooting, treatment from a senile vet who thinks Lucas is a dog and other capers follow, all the while Lucas trying to ditch his idiotic companion and prove his own innocence.

Whilst avoiding the law, the two form an unlikely partnership to help cure the silent Meg and make good their escape. They rescue Meg from the care home she is in (with Ned nearly ruining the whole affair with his clumsiness) and flee for Canada, pretending to be a married couple with a son.

Ned later enters a Canadian bank to change some currency only to find himself taken hostage by a different bank robber in the same manner he originally kidnapped Lucas. Because of this unexpected development, Lucas does not need to say goodbye to Meg, with whom he has formed a bond.

Cast

Reception
The film received negative reviews from critics. Rotten Tomatoes gives the film a score of 14% based on 14 reviews.

References

External links

 
 
 

1989 films
1980s crime comedy films
American action comedy films
American buddy comedy films
American crime comedy films
American remakes of French films
Films produced by Lauren Shuler Donner
Films directed by Francis Veber
Films with screenplays by Francis Veber
Touchstone Pictures films
1980s buddy comedy films
1989 comedy films
1980s English-language films
1980s American films
Films based on works by Francis Veber